Dover Township is a township in Shawnee County, Kansas, in the United States.

History
Dover Township was established in 1867.

References

Townships in Shawnee County, Kansas
Townships in Kansas